Riemke is a major district of the city of Bochum, Ruhr area, North Rhine-Westphalia, Germany. Riemke borders to the city of Herne. The other districts of Bochum, Riemke borders to are Bergen-Hiltrop, Grumme and Hofstede.

Riemke is known for the large Nokia works, that was expanded in recent years.

Riemke was mentioned for the first time as "Rymbecke" in the 9th century. A market square is situated in the center of Riemke.

Riemke has the highest point of Bochum, the Tippelsberg.

In the east of Riemke is the Naturschutzgebiet Zillertal.

Riemke is connected by the A43 Autobahn. Additionally Riemke is connected by rail at the line  Bochum-Gelsenkirchen (formerly Nokia-Bahn).

On 1 April 1926 the municipality of Riemke was integrated into the city of Bochum. Riemke is a district that is more working class.

Boroughs of Bochum